George William Bruns (born August 30, 1946, in Brooklyn, New York) is a retired American basketball player.

He played collegiately for Manhattan College graduating in 1966.

He played for the New York Nets (1972–73) in the ABA for 13 games.

Bruns was also a teacher and head basketball and baseball coach at Monsignor McClancy Memorial High School in East Elmhurst, Queens, New York. His 1971 McClancy Crusaders team went to the NY CHSAA City Championships only to lose to LaSalle Academy in the City finals played at Rose Hill at Fordham.

Bruns is currently the boys high school varsity basketball coach at Manhasset High School, Manhasset, New York. He led the team to the Nassau County Championship during the 2010–2011 season. He also led the team to the Long Island Championship during the 2018–2019 season, only to lose to Poughkeepsie in the state championships. 

Bruns also runs a basketball camp for kids ages 6–15 every summer, which has been going on for over 40 consecutive years.

He is also on the faculty of Nassau Community College where he teaches math and has coached basketball at the collegiate level.

References

External links

1946 births
Living people
American men's basketball players
Basketball players from New York City
Hamden Bics players
Manhattan Jaspers basketball players
New York Nets players
Point guards
Sportspeople from Brooklyn